The TSport 200 is a NASCAR Camping World Truck Series race at Lucas Oil Indianapolis Raceway Park in the suburb of Clermont, Indiana, located west of Indianapolis. It was held each year starting in 1995 (the first season of the Truck Series) until 2011 and returned to the Truck Series schedule in 2022. The event has always been held on the same weekend as the NASCAR Cup Series Verizon 200 (previously the Brickyard 400) weekend at the nearby Indianapolis Motor Speedway, similar to the IndyCar Road to Indy Carb Night Classic serving the same purpose for the Indianapolis 500. From 1995 to 2000, the race was held on Thursday night. From 2001 to 2011, and again in 2022, the race was held on Friday night.

History

1995–2011
Kyle Busch made his first NASCAR Truck series start in the 2001 edition of the race at the age of 16. 

In 2011 Ross Chastain had his first Truck Series start at that years version of the race.

2022–present
On December 10, 2021, TSport, a company co-owned by Southern Off-Road Specialists as well as Truck Series team ThorSport Racing, was announced as the race's title sponsor in its return in 2022.

Race results

1997, 1999, 2007, & 2022: Race extended due to a green–white–checker finish.

Multiple winners (drivers)

Multiple winners (teams)

Manufacturer wins

References

External links
 

NASCAR Truck Series races
NASCAR races at Lucas Oil Raceway at Indianapolis
Recurring sporting events established in 1995
Recurring sporting events disestablished in 2011
1995 establishments in Indiana
2011 disestablishments in Indiana

2022 establishments in the United States